The 1992 Thai Sky/555 Asian Open was a professional ranking snooker tournament that took place between 14–19 January 1992 at the Imperial Queens Park Hotel in Bangkok, Thailand.

Steve Davis won the tournament by defeating Alan McManus 9–3 in the final. The defending champion Stephen Hendry was eliminated in the last 32 by Joe Swail.


Main draw

References

1992 in snooker
1992 in Thai sport